Ma Kyin Lwan (born 5 May 1966) is a Burmese racewalker. She competed in the women's 10 kilometres walk at the 1992 Summer Olympics.

References

External links
 

1966 births
Living people
Athletes (track and field) at the 1992 Summer Olympics
Burmese female racewalkers
Olympic athletes of Myanmar
Place of birth missing (living people)
Southeast Asian Games medalists in athletics
Southeast Asian Games gold medalists for Myanmar